The Jas-Mos coal mine is a large mine in the south of Poland in Jastrzębie-Zdrój, Silesian Voivodeship, 260 km south-west of the capital, Warsaw. Jas-Mos represents one of the largest coal reserve in Poland having estimated reserves of 34.1 million tonnes of coal. The annual coal production is around 3.95 million tonnes.

References

External links 
 Official site

Coal mines in Poland
Buildings and structures in Jastrzębie-Zdrój
Coal mines in Silesian Voivodeship